Spilarctia congruenta is a moth in the family Erebidae. It was described by Thomas in 1993. It is found on Sumatra and Java.

References

congruenta
Moths described in 1993